Erebus jaintiana is a moth of the family Erebidae first described by Charles Swinhoe in 1896. It is found in the Indian state of Meghalaya and in Vietnam.

References

Moths described in 1896
Erebus (moth)